Oronsay is an uninhabited tidal island in Loch Bracadale on the west coast of Skye, Scotland.

It is c.1,000 metres (0.7miles) long by 220m wide running approximately north-east to south west.

At low tide (approx. below 4 metres) the island is connected to Ullinish Point on Skye  via a narrow rocky causeway, some 200m long. 
The name Oronsay is believed to derive from the Old Norse for 'tidal island'.

Views from the westward side are to the Atlantic, Idrigill Point, Macleod's Maidens, with the much larger island of Wiay c.0.8 miles north-west, behind which the flat tops of Healabhal Bheag and Healabhal Mhòr (Macleod's Tables) dominate from the Duirinish Peninsula.

Behind Wiay some 2.7miles north-west is Harlosh Island (narrowly separated from Harlosh on Skye) and to the east of this, 1.7miles north-west (and directly north of Wiay) is Tarner Island.

Below the westernmost cliff of Oronsay sit several small sea stacks and the coast of the island contains several caves, however these are largely accessible except from the sea.

Oronsay is a well known hiking destination.

Images of the cliffs of Oronsay

Footnotes

Landforms of the Isle of Skye
Tidal islands of Scotland
Uninhabited islands of Highland (council area)